Americium compounds are compounds containing the element americium (Am). These compounds can form in the +2, +3 and +4, although the +3 oxidation state is the most common. The +5, +6 and +7 oxidation states have also been reported.

Oxides 

Three americium oxides are known, with the oxidation states +2 (AmO), +3 (Am2O3) and +4 (AmO2). Americium(II) oxide was prepared in minute amounts and has not been characterized in detail. Americium(III) oxide is a red-brown solid with a melting point of 2205 °C. Americium(IV) oxide is the main form of solid americium which is used in nearly all its applications. As most other actinide dioxides, it is a black solid with a cubic (fluorite) crystal structure.

The oxalate of americium(III), vacuum dried at room temperature, has the chemical formula Am2(C2O4)3·7H2O. Upon heating in vacuum, it loses water at 240 °C and starts decomposing into AmO2 at 300 °C, the decomposition completes at about 470 °C. The initial oxalate dissolves in nitric acid with the maximum solubility of 0.25 g/L.

Halides 

Halides of americium are known for the oxidation states +2, +3 and +4, where the +3 is most stable, especially in solutions.

Reduction of Am(III) compounds with sodium amalgam yields Am(II) salts – the black halides AmCl2, AmBr2 and AmI2. They are very sensitive to oxygen and oxidize in water, releasing hydrogen and converting back to the Am(III) state. Specific lattice constants are:
 Orthorhombic AmCl2: a = , b =  and c = 
 Tetragonal AmBr2: a =  and c = . They can also be prepared by reacting metallic americium with an appropriate mercury halide HgX2, where X = Cl, Br or I:
 {Am} + \underset{mercury\ halide}{HgX2} ->[{} \atop 400 - 500 ^\circ \ce C] {AmX2} + {Hg}

Americium(III) fluoride (AmF3) is poorly soluble and precipitates upon reaction of Am3+ and fluoride ions in weak acidic solutions:

 Am^3+ + 3F^- -> AmF3(v)

The tetravalent americium(IV) fluoride (AmF4) is obtained by reacting solid americium(III) fluoride with molecular fluorine:

 2AmF3 + F2 -> 2AmF4

Another known form of solid tetravalent americium fluoride is KAmF5. Tetravalent americium has also been observed in the aqueous phase. For this purpose, black Am(OH)4 was dissolved in 15-M NH4F with the americium concentration of 0.01 M. The resulting reddish solution had a characteristic optical absorption spectrum which is similar to that of AmF4 but differed from other oxidation states of americium. Heating the Am(IV) solution to 90 °C did not result in its disproportionation or reduction, however a slow reduction was observed to Am(III) and assigned to self-irradiation of americium by alpha particles.

Most americium(III) halides form hexagonal crystals with slight variation of the color and exact structure between the halogens. So, chloride (AmCl3) is reddish and has a structure isotypic to uranium(III) chloride (space group P63/m) and the melting point of 715 °C. The fluoride is isotypic to LaF3 (space group P63/mmc) and the iodide to BiI3 (space group R). The bromide is an exception with the orthorhombic PuBr3-type structure and space group Cmcm. Crystals of americium hexahydrate (AmCl3·6H2O) can be prepared by dissolving americium dioxide in hydrochloric acid and evaporating the liquid. Those crystals are hygroscopic and have yellow-reddish color and a monoclinic crystal structure.

Oxyhalides of americium in the form AmVIO2X2, AmVO2X, AmIVOX2 and AmIIIOX can be obtained by reacting the corresponding americium halide with oxygen or Sb2O3, and AmOCl can also be produced by vapor phase hydrolysis:
 AmCl3 + H2O -> AmOCl + 2HCl

Other inorganic compounds

Hydroxide 

The only known hydroxide of americium is Am(OH)3, which is the first compound of americium, discovered in 1944 as part of the Manhattan project. Americium hydroxide is a pink solid which is sparingly soluble in water. Due to self-irradiation the crystal structure of 241Am(OH)3 decomposes within 4–6 months, while for curium(III) hydroxide 244Cm(OH)3 the same process takes less than a day.

When ozone is bubbled through a slurry of americium(III) hydroxide in 0.03 M potassium bicarbonate at 92 °C, hexagonal KAmO2CO3 (potassium dioxoamericium(V) carbonate) can be obtained. Potassium carbonate can also be used. The resulting KAmO2CO3 reacts with dilute acids to produce americium dioxide:

O3 +  Am(OH)3 + KHCO3 + H2O → KAmO2CO3 + 3H2O + O2

Chalcogenides and pnictides 

The known chalcogenides of americium include the sulfide AmS2, selenides AmSe2 and Am3Se4, and tellurides Am2Te3 and AmTe2. The pnictides of americium (243Am) of the AmX type are known for the elements phosphorus, arsenic, antimony and bismuth. They crystallize in the rock-salt lattice.

Silicides and borides 

Americium monosilicide (AmSi) and "disilicide" (nominally AmSix with: 1.87 < x < 2.0) were obtained by reduction of americium(III) fluoride with elementary silicon in vacuum at 1050 °C (AmSi) and 1150−1200 °C (AmSix). AmSi is a black solid isomorphic with LaSi, it has an orthorhombic crystal symmetry. AmSix has a bright silvery lustre and a tetragonal crystal lattice (space group I41/amd), it is isomorphic with PuSi2 and ThSi2. Borides of americium include AmB4 and AmB6. The tetraboride can be obtained by heating an oxide or halide of americium with magnesium diboride in vacuum or inert atmosphere.

Organoamericium compounds 

Analogous to uranocene, americium forms the organometallic compound amerocene with two cyclooctatetraene ligands, with the chemical formula (η8-C8H8)2Am. A cyclopentadienyl complex is also known that is likely to be stoichiometrically AmCp3.

Formation of the complexes of the type Am(n-C3H7-BTP)3, where BTP stands for 2,6-di(1,2,4-triazin-3-yl)pyridine, in solutions containing n-C3H7-BTP and Am3+ ions has been confirmed by EXAFS. Some of these BTP-type complexes selectively interact with americium and therefore are useful in its selective separation from lanthanides and another actinides.

See also 

 Europium compounds
 Curium compounds

References 

Americium compounds
Americium
Chemical compounds by element